Philippe de Vitry (31 October 1291 – 9 June 1361) was a French composer-poet, bishop and music theorist in the  style of late medieval music. An accomplished, innovative, and influential composer, he was widely acknowledged as a leading musician of his day, with Petrarch writing a glowing tribute, calling him:  "... the keenest and most ardent seeker of truth, so great a philosopher of our age." The important music treatise Ars nova notandi (1322) is usually attributed to Vitry.

It is thought that very little of Vitry's compositions survive; though he wrote secular music, only his sacred works are extant.

Life and career
Details of his early life are vague.  While some medieval sources claim that he was born in the Champagne region, more recent research indicates that he may have originated in Vitry-en-Artois near Arras.  Given that he is often referred to in documents as "Magister," he is thought likely to have studied at the University of Paris.  Later he was prominent in the courts of Charles IV, Philippe VI and Jean II, serving as a secretary and advisor; perhaps aided by these Bourbon connections, he also held several canonries, including Clermont, Beauvais and Paris, also serving for a time in the papal retinue at Avignon starting with Clement VI.  In addition to all this, he was a diplomat and a soldier, known to have served at the siege of Aiguillon in 1346.  In 1351 he became Bishop of Meaux, east of Paris. Moving in all the most important political, artistic and ecclesiastical circles, he was acquainted with many lights of the age, including Petrarch and the famous mathematician, philosopher and music theorist Nicole Oresme. He died in Paris on 9 June 1361.

Music
Philippe de Vitry is most famous in music history for the Ars nova notandi (1322), a treatise on music attributed to him that lent its name to the music of the entire era. While his authorship and the very existence of this treatise have recently come into question, a handful of his musical works do survive and show the innovations in musical notation, particularly mensural and rhythmic, with which he was credited within a century of their inception.  Such innovations as are exemplified in his stylistically attributed motets for the Roman de Fauvel were particularly important, and made possible the free and quite complex music of the next hundred years, culminating in the Ars subtilior.  In some ways the "modern" system of rhythmic notation began with the Ars Nova, during which music might be said to have "broken free" from the older idea of the rhythmic modes, patterns which were repeated without being individually notated.  The notational predecessors of modern time meters also originate in the Ars Nova.

He is reputed to have written chansons and motets, but only some of the motets have survived.  Each is strikingly individual, exploiting a unique structural idea.  He is also often credited with developing the concept of isorhythm (an isorhythmic line consists of repeating patterns of rhythms and pitches, but the patterns overlap rather than correspond; e.g., a line of thirty consecutive notes might contain five repetitions of a six-note melody or six repetitions of a five-note rhythm).

Five of his three-part motets have survived in the Roman de Fauvel; an additional nine can be found in the Ivrea Codex.

Works

While there is still debate about what Vitry did and did not compose, the first sixteen works here, all motets, are widely considered to be his.

Attributed on strong historical evidence

 Aman novi / Heu Fortuna / Heu me, tristis est anima mea
 Cum statua / Hugo / Magister invidie
 Douce playsence / Garison / Neuma quinti toni
 Floret / Florens / Neuma
 Garrit gallus / In nova fert / Neuma
 Impudenter circuivi / Virtutibus / Contratenor / Tenor
 O canenda / Rex quem / Contratenor / Rex regum
 Petre clemens / Lugentium / Tenor
 Tribum / Quoniam secta / Merito hec patimur
 Tuba sacre fidei / In arboris / Virgo sum
 Vos quid admiramini / Gratissima / Contratenor / Gaude gloriosa

Note: The motet Phi millies / O creator / Iacet granum / Quam sufflabit and the ballade De terre en grec Gaulle appellee are securely attributed to Vitry, but no music for the latter survives, whilst the former survives only fragmentarily (see Zayaruznaya, 2018).

Attributed on a combination of weaker historical evidence and stylistic grounds

 Colla iugo / Bona condit / Libera me Domine
 Firmissime / Adesto / Alleluya, Benedictus
 Flos ortus / Celsa cedrus / Tenor
 Orbis orbatus / Vos pastores / Fur non venit (less widely accepted)
 Quid scire proderit / Dantur officia (less widely accepted)

Attributed on stylistic grounds alone (not widely accepted)

 Almifonis / Rosa / Tenor
 Amer / Durement / Dolor meus
 Apta caro / Flos / Alma redemptorisa mater
 In virtute / Decens carmen / Clamor meus / Contratenor
 O Philippe / O bone
 Per grama protho paret
 Scariotis / Jure
 Se cuers / Rex
 Se paour / Diex / Concupisco
 Servant regem / O Philippe / Rex regum

Recordings
2009 – En un gardin. Les quatre saisons de l'Ars Nova. Manuscrits de Stavelot, Mons, Utrecht, Leiden. Capilla Flamenca. MEW 0852. Contains recordings of "Vos quid admiramini virginem / Gratissima virginis / Gaude gloriosa" and "Adesto sancta trinitas / Firmissime fidem / Alleluia Benedicta" by Philippe de Vitry.

References

Citations

Sources
Books

 
 

Journal and encyclopedia articles

  
 Fuller, Sarah. "A Phantom Treatise of the Fourteenth Century? The Ars Nova". The Journal of Musicology 4, no. 1 (Winter 1985–86): 23–50.
 Leech-Wilkinson, Daniel. "The Emergence of Ars Nova," The Journal of Musicology 13 (1995): 285–317.
 Sanders, Ernest H. "Philippe de Vitry". The New Grove Dictionary of Music and Musicians, ed. Stanley Sadie.  20 vol.  London, Macmillan Publishers Ltd., 1980.  
 Schrade, Leo. "Philippe de Vitry: Some New Discoveries". The Musical Quarterly 42, no. 3 (July 1956): 330–54.
 Wathey, Andrew. "The Motets of Philippe de Vitry and the Fourteenth-Century Renaissance". Early Music History 12 (1993): 119–50.
 Zayaruznaya, Anna. "New voices for Vitry". Early Music 46 issue 3 (August 2018): 375–392.
 Wathey, Andrew. "Philippe de Vitry, Bishop of Meaux". Early Music History 38 (2019): 215–68.

External links

 
 
 
 Works by Philippe de Vitry in the Medieval Music Database from La Trobe University

14th-century French composers
French music theorists
French classical composers
French male classical composers
Writers from Paris
Bishops of Meaux
1291 births
1361 deaths
French male non-fiction writers
Medieval male composers
14th-century Latin writers
Ars nova composers
Medieval music theorists